March 20 – Eastern Orthodox liturgical calendar – March 22

All fixed commemorations below are observed on April 3 by Orthodox Churches on the Old Calendar.

For March 21st, Orthodox Churches on the Old Calendar commemorate the Saints listed on March 8.

Saints

 Martyrs Philemon and Domninus of Thessalonica, in Italy.  (see also: March 26)
 Saint Maria the Martyr, in Perge.
 Saint Serapion, Bishop of Thmuis, Egypt (c. 358)
 Venerable Serapion the Sindonite, monk of Egypt (5th century) (see also: May 14)
 Saint Sophronius, Abbot of the Monastery of St. Theodosius, in Palestine (542)
 Saint Thomas, Patriarch of Constantinople (610)
 Venerable Jacob the Confessor (James the Confessor), Bishop, of the Studion (late 8th century)

Pre-Schism Western saints

 Saint Beryllus, Bishop of Catania (c. 90)
 Saint Lupicinus of Condat, desert-dweller of the Jura Mountains, Gaul (480)
 Saint Enda of Aran, Abbot of Arranmore, monk, earliest leader of Irish monasticism (530)

Post-Schism Orthodox saints

 New Martyr Michael of Agrapha (Michael of Soluneia), at Thessalonica (1544 or 1547)
 Venerable Seraphim of Vyritsa (1949)

New martyrs and confessors

 New Hieromartyr Vladimir Vvedensky, Priest (1931)
 New Hieromartyr Theodore (Pozdeyevsky), Archbishop (1938)  (see also: October 10)

Other commemorations

 Glorification of Venerable Pachomius, Abbot, of Nerekhta (1384) (see also: May 15)

Gallery

Notes

References

Sources
 March 21/April 3. Orthodox Calendar (PRAVOSLAVIE.RU).
 April 3 / March 21. HOLY TRINITY RUSSIAN ORTHODOX CHURCH (A parish of the Patriarchate of Moscow).
 March 21. OCA – The Lives of the Saints.
 The Autonomous Orthodox Metropolia of Western Europe and the Americas (ROCOR). St. Hilarion Calendar of Saints for the year of our Lord 2004. St. Hilarion Press (Austin, TX). p. 23.
 March 21. Latin Saints of the Orthodox Patriarchate of Rome.
 The Roman Martyrology. Transl. by the Archbishop of Baltimore. Last Edition, According to the Copy Printed at Rome in 1914. Revised Edition, with the Imprimatur of His Eminence Cardinal Gibbons. Baltimore: John Murphy Company, 1916. pp. 82–83.
Greek Sources
 Great Synaxaristes:  21 ΜΑΡΤΙΟΥ. ΜΕΓΑΣ ΣΥΝΑΞΑΡΙΣΤΗΣ.
  Συναξαριστής. 21 Μαρτίου. ECCLESIA.GR. (H ΕΚΚΛΗΣΙΑ ΤΗΣ ΕΛΛΑΔΟΣ). 
Russian Sources
  3 апреля (21 марта). Православная Энциклопедия под редакцией Патриарха Московского и всея Руси Кирилла (электронная версия). (Orthodox Encyclopedia – Pravenc.ru).
  21 марта (ст.ст.) 3 апреля 2013 (нов. ст.). Русская Православная Церковь Отдел внешних церковных связей. (DECR).

March in the Eastern Orthodox calendar